Stephen Nolan is an Irish sportsperson. He plays hurling with his local club Faythe Harriers and also plays hurling for the Wexford senior team.

References

Living people
Faythe Harriers hurlers
Wexford inter-county hurlers
Year of birth missing (living people)